This list of churches in Hillerød Municipality lists church buildings in Hillerød Municipality, Denmark.

List

See also
 Listed buildings in Hillerød Municipality

References

External links

 Nordens kirker: Nordsjælland

 
Hillerod